Ismaël Keïta Vieira (born 8 July 1990) is a Malian professional footballer who plays as a defensive midfielder for French club Créteil.

Club career
Born in Bamako, Keïta started his career with the Centre Salif Keita in 2007. On 12 August 2009, he joined French Ligue 2 club Nantes, signing a four-year contract. He made his league debut as a substitute in a 0–1 defeat against Arles-Avignon on 30 April 2010.

At the end of his contract he left Nantes and signed a three-year contract with fellow Ligue 2 side Angers. His league debut came on 2 August 2013 in a 2–4 away victory over Istres.

Midway through the final year of his Angers contract, he agreed a termination deal with the club, and signed a six-month deal with Paris FC, with an option for an additional year if the club remained in Ligue 2. Paris FC were relegated at the end of the season, and Keïta was without a club until he signed for TFF First League side Gazişehir Gaziantep on 5 January 2017.

In September 2017 Keïta returned to France, signing for Championnat National side Cholet. After two seasons as a regular starter for Cholet, Keïta had an aborted transfer to Red Star in the summer of 2019, which disrupted the start to the 2019–20 season. At the end of the season he signed for Orléans on a one-year contract with an option to extend to a second year.

On 13 July 2022, Keïta joined Créteil in the fourth tier.

International career
Between 2010 and 2011, he won six caps for the Mali national team.

References

External links

1990 births
Living people
Sportspeople from Bamako
Association football midfielders
Malian footballers
Mali international footballers
JS Centre Salif Keita players
FC Nantes players
Angers SCO players
SO Cholet players
Paris FC players
Gaziantep F.K. footballers
US Orléans players
US Créteil-Lusitanos players
Ligue 2 players
Championnat National players
TFF First League players
Malian expatriate footballers
Expatriate footballers in Turkey
Expatriate footballers in France
Malian expatriate sportspeople in France
Malian expatriate sportspeople in Turkey